Zoltán Szlezák (born 26 December 1967 in Balassagyarmat, Hungary) is a retired Hungarian football player who has spent most of his career playing for Újpest FC.He played as a centre back. He was considered a fan's favourite in Újpest. He played 9 matches between 1994 and 1997 for the Hungarian national team.

Honours

Club
Újpest FC
 Hungarian League: 1990, 1998
 Runner-up: 1995, 1997
 Hungarian Cup: 1992, 2002
 Runner-up 1998

References

1967 births
Living people
Hungarian footballers
Hungary international footballers
Újpest FC players
People from Balassagyarmat
Association football central defenders
Sportspeople from Nógrád County